Mitsuhiro Kinoshita (born January 31, 1965) is a Japanese race car driver.

Racing record

Complete Japanese Touring Car Championship (1994-) results

Complete JGTC/Super GT Results

References 

1965 births
Living people
Japanese racing drivers
Japanese Touring Car Championship drivers
Super GT drivers
Japanese Formula 3 Championship drivers
21st-century Japanese people